(Popular Culture, or Folklore, Museum) is a museum in the district of Santa Lucia, just south of Barva, Costa Rica. It is located in the former home of ex-president Alfredo Gonzalez Flores.

It has a number of notable displays related to the transitional period from late 19th to early 20th century in Costa Rica, demonstrating the fashion and popular culture during this period.

The museum also offers places where visitors can cook easy & traditional recipes from costarrican culture.

It is maintained and curated by the National University of Costa Rica.

References

Museums in Costa Rica
Buildings and structures in Heredia Province
Tourist attractions in Heredia Province